Vasyok Trubachyov and His Comrades is a 1955 Soviet adventure film directed by Ilya Frez

Plot 
The film shows the life of schoolchildren from the USSR on the eve of the Great Patriotic War, the film tells how easily a friend can become an adversary.

Cast
  Oleg Vishnev  as Vasyok Trubachyov
 Aleksandr Chudakov as Kolya Odintsov
  Vladimir Semenovich as Sasha Bulgakov
  Vyacheslav Devkin as Mazin
 Georgi Aleksandrov as  Rusakov
 Natalya Rychagova as Nyura Sinitsyna
 Valeri Safarbekov as Malyutin
  Yury Bashkirov  as Medvedev
  Yury Bogolyubov  as teacher
 Leonid Kharitonov as Burtsev
 Ivan Pelttser as school watchman
 Anastasia Zuyeva as Aunt Dunya
 Pyotr Aleynikov as Rusakov's father  
 Yury Medvedev as Trubachyov's father
 Kirill Lavrov as stonemason

See also
 Trubachyov's Detachment Is Fighting (1957)

References

External links 
 

1955 films
Russian children's drama films
1950s children's drama films
Soviet black-and-white films
Gorky Film Studio films
Soviet drama films
1955 drama films
Russian black-and-white films
Soviet children's films